The New Lincoln School was a private experimental coeducational school in New York City enrolling students from kindergarten through grade 12.

History
New Lincoln's predecessor was founded as Lincoln School in 1917 by the Rockefeller-funded General Education Board as "a pioneer experimental school for newer educational methods," under the aegis of Columbia University's Teachers College. In 1941 Teachers College merged Lincoln School with Horace Mann School, which it operated as a demonstration school. When Teachers College closed down the combined school in 1946, parents of Lincoln School enrollees established the New Lincoln School in 1948 as "an extension of the philosophy which made those [predecessor] schools famous," i.e., to carry on the tradition of progressive, experimental education, concentrating on the individual child, offering an interdisciplinary core program as well as electives in elementary grades, and emphasizing the arts.

In 1956, the school acquired the former Boardman School on East 82nd Street and moved its Lower School (through second grade) to that campus, under the coordination of Terry Spitalny.

In 1974, the school moved to 210 East 77th Street. The school merged with the Walden School in Fall 1988 to become the New Walden Lincoln School, which ultimately closed in Summer 1991.

The progressive education movement had a significant impact on curriculum and instruction in American schools. For example, as a demonstration school, New Lincoln, like its predecessors, attracted widespread attention, including about 1,000 visitors each year. Eleanor Roosevelt attended the school’s tenth anniversary celebration and conference and wrote in her syndicated newspaper column that “this day was one of the most stimulating that I have spent in a long time.”

Campus
The New Lincoln School building had previously been the 110th Street Community Center. An eight-story building that had been recently renovated and had a swimming pool in the basement, it was further renovated to meet the new school's needs of a cafeteria, classrooms, laboratories, and a library.

After the school closed the West 110th Street site became home to the Lincoln Correctional Facility, a minimum-security work-release center, which itself closed in 2019. The East 77th Street campus has been occupied by the Birch Wathen School since 1989.

Curriculum

The curriculum was centered on Core, a combination of Social Studies and English. Other subjects were tied in to Core as much as possible, for instance, songs chosen for Music class or projects chosen for Home Economics. Each class put on a play each year arising from their Core studies. Core was designed to focus on the real world as experienced by the students. Thus when the 5th-6th grades studied their city, New York, there was a section on Tunnels and Bridges, as well as one on History; and when a 7th-8th grade class studied Japan they built a “house” of homemade shoji screens in their classroom. Science, Art, and Math were generally not linked to Core, but still emphasized hands-on approaches to learning.

Instruction was individualized, with individual exploration and small work groups greatly encouraged. Seating plans were generally informal, and most teachers were called by their first names. Foreign language instruction, French and Spanish, began in the eighth grade.

The arts were stressed. An extensive studio art program explored many media. The ceramics program used kilns and a wide range of materials. The school used a great variety of instruments in teaching, and students played on autoharps, temple blocks, marimbas, and gongs. Singing ranged from folk and work songs to Broadway tunes. Besides Music and Art, all students, regardless of gender, took Wood Shop and Home Economics.

While grade levels were conventional, the Middle School combined fifth and sixth grades and seventh and eighth into two or three groups each. Groups were identified by letters, not by grade level, so that first grade was called Group A, second grade Group B, up to 7th-8th grades, Groups K, L, and M. This was intended to de-emphasize age and grade differences.

Racial integration 
Prominent educator William Heard Kilpatrick (a student of John Dewey’s) assisted in founding New Lincoln and became chair of its board. He believed that education was critically important to combat the evil of prejudice. Consequently, in the 1950s New Lincoln’s board included several prominent black people, including Kenneth Clark, psychologist, and Ralph Bunche, Undersecretary of the United Nations. One of the goals for the school was to help students become competent “in relating constructively with a variety of human beings from different economic levels, religions, races, and nationalities.”

Starting in the 1950s, a number of influential Black people enrolled their children at New Lincoln including Harry Belafonte (singer, songwriter, activist and actor), Robert Carter (a prominent civil rights lawyer and judge), Faith Ringgold (painter, writer, sculptor and quilter), and Eileen Jackson Southern (the first black woman to be tenured at Harvard).

Following the Supreme Court’s Brown vs. Board of Education desegregation decision, Minnijean Brown was one of the students who integrated the Little Rock, Arkansas public schools. In 1958, after she was expelled from Little Rock’s Central High School, and at the urging of director John Brooks, New Lincoln offered her a scholarship to attend the school, which she accepted.

Initially only a small percentage of New Lincoln students were Black or members of other minority groups. By 1970, however, New Lincoln had among the highest percentages of minorities in New York private schools (22%) and more than 60% of its scholarship fund was spent to support minority students. In his memoir, then-director of the school Harold Haizlip wrote that, “New Lincoln was firmly committed to integration. Over time, the board, faculty, and parents decided to increase the minority presence in the school beyond a token level and set fundraising priorities and targets to make this possible.” As a result, many notable alumni, such as some of those listed below, are people of color.

Several important leaders of the school were Black. Dr. Mabel Smythe, who was head of the high school from 1959 to 1969, “went to various churches all over Harlem” to look for potential students from that community. (Before joining New Lincoln in the mid-1950s, Smythe assisted Thurgood Marshall at the NAACP Legal Defense Fund, and after leaving New Lincoln she became Ambassador to Cameroon and Equatorial Guinea.) Harold Haizlip, director of the school from 1968-1971, later became Commissioner of Education for the U.S. Virgin Islands for eight years. Verne Oliver had a distinguished teaching career at New Lincoln starting in 1957, and became director of the school from 1971–1974. In 1963, Oliver arranged for Ralph Ellison to speak with the senior class about his award-winning book Invisible Man. That same year Kenneth and Mamie Clark (founders of the Northside Center for Child Development, housed on one floor of the New Lincoln School) arranged with Malcolm X for Mamie to take two 12th grade students, one Black and one white, to meet with Malcolm X at a Black Muslim coffee shop on Lenox Avenue, in Harlem. This was a period when Malcolm X seldom spoke to white people.

Notable alumni

Lisa Aronson Fontes, psychologist and author
 Robin Bartlett, actress
Shari Belafonte, actress
Minnijean Brown of the Little Rock Nine
Alan S. Chartock
Shirley Clarke, filmmaker
Suzanne de Passe, film and television producer
Brandon deWilde, actor
Donald H. Elliott, urban planner
Bonnie Erbé journalist and television host
Tisa Farrow, actress
Maria Foscarinis, founder of the National Law Center on Homelessness & Poverty
Thelma Golden, curator
Deborah Holland, singer-songwriter and film composer
Wendy Jedlička, designer, educator, author, sustainability advocate 
Charles Kadushin, psychologist and professor
Steve Knight, musician
David Lowenthal, geographer and historian
Dinah Manoff American stage, film, and television actress and television director.
Robert M. Morgenthau, lawyer, New York City District Attorney (Lincoln School)
Josh Mostel, actor
Jill Nelson, writer
Stanley Nelson Jr., filmmaker
Deborah Offner, actress
Adrian Piper, artist
Stephen Porter Dunn, anthropologist and poet
Mason Reese, actor
Charles A. Reich, legal and social scholar
David Rieff, nonfiction writer and policy analyst
Tad Robinson, American singer, harmonica player, and songwriter
Vicki Sue Robinson singer
 David Rockefeller banker (Lincoln School)
 Nelson Rockefeller politician (Lincoln School)
 Zack Rogow, poet, playwright, literary translator
Elizabeth Sackler, philanthropist
Victor Scheinman, robotic pioneer
Brooke Shields, model, actress
 Andrea Simon, documentary filmmaker
 Nina Simons co-founder & co-CEO of Bioneers
 Michele Wallace, author and professor
 Matthew Wilder, musician
 Jon Wolfsthal, national security expert and journalist
 Michael Wright, actor

School Directors
Dr. John J. Brooks (1948–1959)
E. Francis Bowditch (1959–1960)
Dr. Gerhardt E. Rast (1960-1963)
Edgar S. Bley (1963-1964)
John J. Formanek (1964–1968)
Dr. Harold C. Haizlip (1968–1971)
Verne Oliver (1971-1974)
 Collin Reed (1974-1987)
George Cohan (1987–1988)

In popular culture
A benefit concert for the school on April 19, 1959, at Carnegie Hall by Harry Belafonte was one of two such concerts recorded and released as Belafonte at Carnegie Hall. The other benefit concert, for the Wiltwyck School on April 20, netted $58,000 for that school.

References
Notes

External links
New Lincoln School

Defunct schools in New York City
Educational institutions established in 1948
Educational institutions disestablished in 1988
1948 establishments in New York City
1988 disestablishments in New York (state)
Private elementary schools in Manhattan
Private middle schools in Manhattan
Private high schools in Manhattan